Dunlop Tyres is a brand of tyres which is managed by different companies around the world. It was founded by pneumatic tyre pioneer John Boyd Dunlop in Dublin, Ireland, in 1889. 

The brand is operated by Goodyear in North America (passenger car & light truck), Europe, Australia and New Zealand.

On October 1, 2015, Sumitomo Rubber Industries acquired the Dunlop Motorcycle tire brand in North America from the Goodyear Tire and Rubber Company after dissolving its 16-year global joint venture.

In India, the brand is operated by Dunlop India Ltd. (having started its business there in 1926, owned by the Ruia Group). In several other Asian countries (Japan, China, Indonesia, Thailand and Russia), Africa and Latin America (except Mexico), Dunlop Tires is operated by Sumitomo Rubber Industries. In Malaysia, the Dunlop Tyre brand has, since 2012, been operated by Continental AG, which manufactures Dunlop branded tyres for sale in Malaysia, Singapore and Brunei.

Overview 
In 1985, the Dunlop Rubber Company was acquired by now-defunct BTR plc, and Sumitomo acquired the rights to manufacture and market Dunlop branded road tyres. Sumitomo did not acquire any Dunlop company. In 1997 Sumitomo gained agreement to use the Dunlop name in its corporate name, and changed the name of its UK subsidiary to "Dunlop Tyres Ltd."

In 1999, Sumitomo and Goodyear began a joint venture by which Sumitomo continued to manufacture all Japanese-made tyres under the Dunlop name, while Goodyear Tire and Rubber Company bought 75% of the European and North American tyre businesses of Sumitomo.

The company has extensive manufacturing operations throughout the world. With the closure of the Washington plant in 2006, Goodyear Dunlop ceased mainstream car and lorry tyre production in the UK.

In 2016, it was announced that Sumitomo would commence the second phase of its 131 million investment for the upgrade and expansion of its Dunlop tyre manufacturing plant in Ladysmith, South Africa.

Until May 2014, Goodyear Dunlop occupied a compact part Fort Dunlop site in Birmingham as its UK office. In the UK, the company operates as a sales organisation, importing tyres from manufacturing plants around the world, including Germany, Slovenia and Poland.

The Goodyear Dunlop joint venture is managed from sites in Luxembourg and Brussels, which report to Goodyear in Akron, Ohio, United States.

Fort Dunlop
Fort Dunlop was a motorsport manufacturing operation located in a corner of the original Dunlop factory in Erdington, Birmingham, established in 1891 until May 2014. This factory produced specialised vintage, motorcycle and touring car tyres, and produced about 300,000 specialised racing tyres per year. On 30 May 2014, the Birmingham factory ceased tyre production, ending Dunlop tyre production in the UK.

See also
 Dunlop (brands)
 Dunlop Rubber
 Dunlop Sport

Further reading

References

External links

 

Goodyear Tire and Rubber Company
Automotive companies established in 1985
1985 establishments in the United States
Cycle manufacturers of the United Kingdom
British brands
Tyre manufacturers of England